Sandra Peabody (born January 11, 1948) is an American talent agent, acting coach, producer, and former actress and model. She is best known for her work in exploitation horror films and theatrical troupe stage work—both paths defining her decade long acting career. Her career in producing would earn her an Emmy in 1992 for the children's television series Popcorn (1984–92).

She made her film debut as a teen actress with a leading role in the faith-based Misfit (1965) before a supporting role in Luke Moberly's mystery film The Horse Killer (1966). Both films were filmed in Fort Lauderdale, Florida, where she grew up. Her move to New York followed her attempt to foster a more mature image in feature films. This proved successful with her role as Mari Collingwood in Wes Craven's directorial debut The Last House on the Left (1972), followed by Voices of Desire (1972), Massage Parlor Murders (1973), and Teenage Hitchhikers (1974)—all exploitation films. 

Peabody was a part of a theater group in New York and had a career in stage work, beginning with her role as Gwendolyn Pigeon in the revival of Neil Simon's The Odd Couple (1969). She followed this with Robert Kalfin's Off-Broadway musical revue Tarot (1970) and a supporting role as Minnie Oakley in Jay Harnick's musical comedy Annie Get Your Gun (1973–1974). Her last acting role was the Alan J. Wendl directed stage play Tunnel of Love (1977). She now works as a talent agent and acting coach in the Los Angeles and Portland areas and produces children-orientated programming.

Life and career

Early roles
Sandra Lee Peabody was born on January 11, 1948, and grew up in Fort Lauderdale, Florida. She began appearing in stage productions while attending Stranahan High School. In 1965, she began performing in local professional productions. She debuted in Misfit (1965), a  faith-based film that delved into drug abuse and was released into local churches. She replaced an actress who had become sick. She followed this role with another local Florida-lensed film now known as Luke Moberly's lost mystery film The Horse Killer (1966).

In search of broader acting opportunities, Peabody got accepted into Carnegie Mellon University and moved to New York City. She later studied with Sanford Meisner at the Neighborhood Playhouse School of the Theatre. In 1969, she had a role as Gwendolyn Pigeon in Neil Simon's The Odd Couple. Mariruth Campbell of The Journal News described her and Robin Douglas as "both very attractive and competent actresses." She was later a part of the stage plays Celebration, Little Mary Sunshine, and Stop the World – I Want to Get Off (all in 1969). In 1970, Peabody had a supporting role in Robert Kalfin's Off-Broadway production Tarot which ran at the Brooklyn Academy of Music. Additionally, she began to appear on television in commercials and on the two soap operas All My Children and As the World Turns.

The Last House on the Left

Discovery (1972)
Her feature film career in New York City would mark a stark contrast to her ingenuous roles in Misfit and The Horse Killer. In 1970, one of the first roles she signed onto was for the critically panned satirical film The Filthiest Show in Town (1970), a parody of dating game shows. She appeared in the commercial segments. After this role, she went on a cross-country trip across the West Coast. Upon returning home, she responded to a casting notice in the trade publication Backstage for a film under the working title Night of Vengeance. She was originally asked to audition for the supporting role of Phyllis Stone. After meeting with producer Sean S. Cunningham, she got the role of the seventeen-year-old protagonist Mari Collingwood. The film was originally planned to be a hardcore pornographic horror film but, the filmmakers promised her it would just focus on the horror elements. It would ultimately be released as The Last House on the Left, a loose remake of Ingmar Bergman's The Virgin Spring (1960). Director Wes Craven thought highly of Peabody, describing her as "pretty" and "plucky," but acknowledged she lacked the confidence required for the gritty shoot.

Production and aftermath
 
The Last House on the Left was a difficult production for Peabody. The film did not have a complete script at the time of filming, and Peabody was in a vulnerable mental state due to the lack of preparation for her scenes. She has expressed contempt towards her overall performance. Peabody spent a lot of time on the set with Craven, who often encouraged her throughout filming her scenes. She endured an excessive amount of abuse from the lead actors David A. Hess and Marc Sheffler throughout the shoot.

Sheffler, who portrayed Junior, revealed in an interview that he grabbed Peabody, held her over a cliff, and threatened to throw her off if she didn't reach the level of desperation needed for the scene, stating "She wasn’t getting the scene. She wasn’t at the anxiety level that she needed to be. So, we’d done it I don’t know how many times … everybody was getting annoyed. So, I said to Wes, 'Give me a minute with her.' What I did was... you can’t see it in the shot but I took her over to the cliff, and I put her over the cliff and just grabbed her and said, ‘If you don’t get this fucking scene right now, I’m going to drop you and Wes will shoot it, and we’ll get a different scene, but it’ll work because you’ll be fucking mangled.”

Additionally, method actor Hess singled her out from the rest of the cast and treated her differently than female co-stars Lucy Grantham and Jeramie Rain. Peabody stated that he would chase after her with a knife at night and that she genuinely thought he was a serial killer at some point in his life. Hess revealed that he started roughly grabbing her breasts and threatened to rape her during the filming of her assault scene. During this particular shot, assistant director Yvonne Hannemann described it as an upsetting shoot with her in tears and walking off the set. Peabody would ultimately detest the film. During a cast screening, Peabody brought her mother to watch the film with her. Unhappy with the rough cut that she watched, Peabody ultimately walked out. Upon release, the film was a critical and commercial success, earning more than $3 million at the American box office. She attests that while she was horrified while filming it, viewing it in modern times, it is likely considered a "funny film."

Final roles and later career
Chuck Vincent cast her as Anna Reed in the X-rated erotic-horror film Voices of Desire (1972). Peabody's next role was Gwen in Massage Parlor Murders! (1973). It was shown in grindhouse theaters and didn't have a home video release until Vinegar Syndrome restored it on DVD and Blu-ray in 2013. Peabody returned to acting on stage when she was cast as Minnie Oakley in Jay Harnick's musical comedy Annie Get Your Gun, from 1973 to 1974 alongside Barbara Eden and John Bennett Perry.  Jonathan Takiff of Philadelphia Daily News stated, "Clinched up in a shapeless bag of a dress, carrying on in a raggle-taggle performing style, Sandra Peabody is totally believable as an adolescent hick from the sticks. This is why, obviously, she was selected for the role from a literal army of teenage competitors." In 1974, she had a non-speaking cameo role in the horror film Legacy of Satan. The following year, she had a lead role in Gerri Seddley's comedy road movie Teenage Hitchhikers as a teenage runaway. In a review for Los Angeles Times, Linda Gross stated that Peabody's performance was "ingenious."

Her last acting credit is the stage production Tunnel of Love (1977). In 1983, Peabody moved from New York City to Portland, Oregon and began to distance herself from the exploitative films that she was becoming known for and began to transition into television producing and writing Portland based programming aimed at children and youth. Peabody served as producer for the KATU syndicated Emmy-award winning children's television series Popcorn (1984–92). In 1988, Peabody developed A Time to Care (1988), a television documentary series that focused on local nursing homes and the positive effects that community volunteerism had on the residents. She stated that it's "a neat idea for a series because what they're basically saying is that more than ever people are reaching out to help others." The broadcasting division Group W picked up the series for distribution and syndication. Peabody wrote and produced the educational series Zone In (2001) which dealt with "tough issues for kids." , Peabody is an acting coach and agent in areas around Portland, Oregon, and Los Angeles. She has mentored a variety of actors including Alicia Lagano.

Filmography

Film

Stage productions

Television

Notes

References

Works cited

External links
 
 

American film actresses
Actresses from Fort Lauderdale, Florida
Actresses from Portland, Oregon
Living people
Carnegie Mellon University College of Fine Arts alumni
20th-century American actresses
Writers from Portland, Oregon
American film producers
American female models
American women film producers
1948 births